Aadi Mimansa (English: A Rare Solution) is a 1991 Indian Hindi and Odia-language film directed by Apurba Kishore Bir, starring Ashok Kumar, Mohan Gokhale, Neena Gupta, Gloria Mahanty, Bijainee Misra, Nargis and Lalatendu Rath. The film marked the directorial debut of cinematographer Apurba Kishore Bir and went on to win the 1991
Nargis Dutt Award for Best Feature Film on National Integration and Best Cinematography for Bir.

Cast
Ashok Kumar
Mohan Gokhale
Neena Gupta
Gloria Mahanty
Bijainee Misra
Nargis
Lalatendu Rath
Arveen Panda

References

External links 
 

1991 films
1990s Hindi-language films
1990s Odia-language films
Indian multilingual films
Films whose cinematographer won the Best Cinematography National Film Award
Best Film on National Integration National Film Award winners
Films directed by Apurba Kishore Bir